Coast Rider is a steel wild mouse roller coaster at Knott's Berry Farm in Buena Park, California.

History
Coast Rider operates on the former site of Perilous Plunge. Perilous Plunge closed on September 3, 2012. Cedar Fair Entertainment Company filed a trademark for Coast Rider on October 22, 2012. Knott's Berry Farm officially announced Coast Rider and two other rides on November 1, 2012. The ride opened up along with the rest of the brand new boardwalk on May 25, 2013.

Ride experience
The 52 foot ascent to the top of Coast Rider will have everyone clinging to the handrails for the ultimate family coaster experience. The adventure aboard the ride gives guests the feeling of riding the California coast, but once they reach the crest, it is a harrowing journey down the 1,339 feet of track filled with hairpin turns, twists and spins.

The design is an exact replica of the Apple Zapple roller coaster at sister park Kings Dominion. The ride is the same ride experience and layout, except reversed, as Legoland's Lego Technic Test Track roller coaster.

See also
 2013 in amusement parks

References

Wild Mouse roller coasters
Roller coasters introduced in 2013
Roller coasters operated by Cedar Fair
Roller coasters in California